Rzhevsky Versus Napoleon (originally planned title «Наполеон капут!»  Napoleon goes Kaput!) is a Russian-Ukrainian 2012 comedy film, sequel to the 2008 picture Hitler goes Kaput!

Plot
Russia, beginning of the 19th century. The troops of Napoleon Bonaparte (Volodymyr Zelenskyy) are triumphantly advancing into the country. Napoleon already managed to conquer Europe and capture Moscow. Now, the next step in his plan is to win the battle for the Russian capital, St. Petersburg.
Chances for the Russian army to resist the French enemy are extremely small as they are too weak and not prepared. General Kutuzov (Vladimir Simonov) knows that if for some reason Napoleon lingers in Moscow, his army will win valuable time and get a better chance of victory. Only a mysterious Russian woman could distract womanizing Napoleon from his plans to conquer the world. Kutuzov sets off on the challenging task of looking for a suitable candidate.
Lieutenant Rzhevsky (Pavel Derevyanko) is perhaps the most famous tempter in Russia. Now he is serving a life sentence for promoting the sexual revolution. Like Bonaparte, Rzhevsky has an unrivaled skill in enchanting women. The generals offer the lieutenant freedom - all that is required of him in return is to dress himself as a woman and to charm Napoleon. The plan seems simple enough, the lieutenant is confident in his abilities, but suddenly Rzhevsky meets the woman of his dreams —  Miss Moscow 1810 —  Natasha Rostova (Svetlana Khodchenkova)... He is not ready to let her go even for his own freedom.

Cast

Production
Jean-Claude Van Damme agreed to act in the film for free, with only his lodging expenses paid.

Reception
The film received mostly negative reviews.

References

External links

Films directed by Maryus Vaysberg
Russian historical comedy films
2010s historical comedy films
2010s parody films
Russian parody films
Depictions of Napoleon on film
Cultural depictions of Leo Tolstoy
Russian sequel films
Volodymyr Zelenskyy films